Conan the Free Lance is a fantasy novel by American writer Steve Perry, featuring Robert E. Howard's  sword and sorcery hero Conan the Barbarian. It was first published in paperback by Tor Books in February 1990. It was reprinted by Tor in December 1997.

Plot
The evil wizard Dimma the Mist Mage suffers from a curse that has rendered his body insubstantial. As a mystical "Seed" held by the Tree Folk might restore him, he directs his enslaved selkies to steal it for him. A race of lizard people also desires the Seed, as its power of fertility is key to enabling them to establish a new home. Meanwhile, the young Conan, en route to Shadizar, had fallen in with the Tree Folk after rescuing their medicine woman, Cheen. He helps them fend off the selkies' attack, but not before one of them makes off with the Seed and takes Cheen's brother Hok hostage. In the ensuing many-sided contest for the Seed, Conan aids the Tree Folk in recovering it.

Reception
Reviewer Ryan Harvey considered Perry's Conan novels "goofy",  noting that the author "has a reputation among Conan fandom for overkill and general silliness"—and Conan the Free Lance "won't change anyone's mind about Perry's style." He rates it well below the author's previous novels Conan the Fearless and Conan the Defiant and feels the "one arena" in which it excels is in its brevity.

Don D'Ammassa calls the book "[a]nother unusual Conan pastiche" with "some quite well done adventures."

References

External links
Page at Fantastic Fiction

1990 American novels
1990 fantasy novels
Conan the Barbarian novels
American fantasy novels
Tor Books books